Atowar Rahman (15 March 1927–12 February 2002) Was a Bangladeshi writer, researcher and multilingualist. He received the Bangla Academy Literary Award in 1970 for his special contribution to children's literature.

Career 
Atowar Rahman was born on 15 March 1927 in the village of Ramkrishnapur Bahirchar in Kushtia.

Awards and honors 

 Bangla Academy Literary Award (1970)

Bibliography 

 একাত্তর: নির্যাতনের কড়চা
 আমি মুক্তিযোদ্ধা ছিলাম
 শিশু শিক্ষা ও শিশুতোষ প্রবন্ধ সংগ্রহ
 বলয়
 হলদেপাতা
 মনীষীদের জীবন থেকে
 পাখির বাসা খাসা
 শিশুসাহিত্যের কতিপয় রথী
 ১৯৬২, ২০১৬: মহাবিপ্লবের বীর সিপাহী
 ১৯৯২, ২০০৪: সূর্যবাদ
 ঘাসের বনে ছোট্ট কুটির (Original: Laura Ingles Wilder)

 ক্যানটারবেরি উপাখ্যান

Death 
Atowar Rahman died on 12 February 2002.

See also 

 List of Bangla Academy Literary Award recipients (1970–1979)

References 

1927 births
2002 deaths
Recipients of Bangla Academy Award
People from Kushtia District
Bangladeshi male writers